Dresslerella archilae is a species of orchid endemic to Guatemala. Named after the american botanist Robert Dressler.

References

archilae
Orchids of Guatemala
Plants described in 1995